Snelston is a village and civil parish three miles south-west of Ashbourne in Derbyshire, England. It includes Anacrehill. The population of the civil parish as of the 2011 census was 202. A tributary of the River Dove flows through its centre.

The building in the foreground of the photo above is Lower Lodge which stands at the entrance of Snelston Hall. Beyond the lodge is St Peter's Church, Snelston.

The Domesday Book of 1096 listed Snelston in the ancient hundred of Appletree.

Snelston Hall was built in 1827 and was demolished in 1951. The local squire, John Harrison had the village remodelled and a new school built in 1847. The village buildings were designed by the architect Lewis Nockalls Cottingham. This is now a model village.

The parish church of St Peter was substantially rebuilt (except for the tower) in 1825. It is one of the few churches to have had dances regularly held on the roof.

Notable residents
Michael Sadler, MP, factory reformer, was born here in 1780. He reformed the laws for children working in factories.
Hannah Allen, a writer who suffered from religious insanity, was born here in 1638.

See also
Listed buildings in Snelston

Gallery

References

External links

 
 Snelston at DerbyshireUK

Villages in Derbyshire
Civil parishes in Derbyshire
Derbyshire Dales